The fork head domain is a type of protein domain that is often found in transcription factors and whose purpose is to bind DNA.

Function 

The fork head protein of Drosophila melanogaster, a transcription factor that promotes terminal rather than segmental development, contains neither homeodomains nor zinc-fingers characteristic of other transcription factors. Instead, it contains a distinct type of DNA-binding region, containing around 100 amino acids, which has since been identified in a number of transcription factors (including D. melanogaster FD1-5, mammalian HNF3, human HTLF, Saccharomyces cerevisiae HCM1, etc.). This is referred to as the fork head domain but is also known as a "winged helix". The fork head domain binds B-DNA as a monomer, but shows no similarity to previously identified DNA-binding motifs. Although the domain is found in several different transcription factors, a common function is their involvement in early developmental decisions of cell fates during embryogenesis. Members of the class O of forkhead box transcription factors (FoxO) have important roles in metabolism, cellular proliferation, stress tolerance and probably lifespan.

See also 
 FOX proteins

References 

Protein domains

de:Forkhead-Box